Melbourne Phoenix were an Australian netball team that represented Netball Victoria in the Commonwealth Bank Trophy. Between 1997 and 2007, together with Melbourne Kestrels, they were one of two teams to represent Netball Victoria in the Commonwealth Bank Trophy era. Phoenix were the inaugural CBT champions and went on to become the competition's most successful team, winning five premierships. In 2008, when the Commonwealth Bank Trophy was replaced by the ANZ Championship, Phoenix and Kestrels merged to form Melbourne Vixens.

Grand finals

Home venues
In 1997 and 1998, Phoenix played their home games at the Waverley Netball Centre. In 1999 they switched to the Melbourne Sports and Aquatic Centre. In later seasons they played at the State Netball and Hockey Centre.

Notable former players

Internationals

 Abby Sargent 

 Fiona Themann

CBT MVP

CBT Best New Talent

Coaches

Head coaches

Assistant coaches

Sponsorship

Premierships
Commonwealth Bank Trophy
Winners: 1997, 2000, 2002, 2003, 2005: 5
Runners up: 2004, 2007: 2

References

 
Defunct netball teams in Australia
1997 establishments in Australia
Sports clubs established in 1997
2007 disestablishments in Australia
Sports clubs disestablished in 2007
Commonwealth Bank Trophy teams
!
Phoenix